Wincanton Museum is a small local museum, originally located in the High Street and then in the Wincanton Library, Wincanton, Somerset, England.

It was housed in a late 18th or early 19th century, Grade II listed cottage which is owned by the Quakers.

The Museum had a collection of artifacts, documents, posters and photographs related to the social history of Wincanton and the surrounding district. There was also a replica of a Victorian kitchen and a collection of 19th and 20th century farm implements. A separate room was devoted to World War I and World War II when American soldiers were stationed in the town prior to the D Day landings.

The museum closed in 2009, due to increased rents and the need for renovations to the building, reopened in the original space in 2010, and closed again in 2011. In 2012, the museum moved into the Wincanton Library with a smaller collection.

References

Grade II listed buildings in South Somerset
History of Somerset
Local museums in Somerset
Wincanton
Defunct museums in England